Mahir Cümşüd oğlu Muradov (25 July 1956 – 5 January 2023) was an Azerbaijani judge. He served on the Constitutional Court of Azerbaijan from 2012 to 2023.

Muradov died in Baku on 5 January 2023, at the age of 66.

References

1956 births
2023 deaths
Azerbaijani judges
Baku State University alumni
Lawyers from Baku